Pôle Espoirs Fédéral de Saint-Sébastien-sur-Loire, commonly referred to as PEF Saint-Sébastien-sur-Loire, is the regional association football centre and is one of the nine élite academies of France. Located in Saint-Sébastien-sur-Loire, Loire-Atlantique, only the best players from the Pays de la Loire région train there. There are eight other élite youth academies in Metropolitan France (Castelmaurou, Châteauroux, Clairefontaine, Liévin, Dijon, Marseille, Vichy and Reims) covering the whole territory.

Youth development
PEF Saint-Sébastien-sur-Loire incorporates the same training methods as Clairefontaine:
 Making the player’s movements faster and better
 Linking movements efficiently and wisely
 Using the weaker foot
 Weaknesses in the player’s game
 Psychological factors (sports personality tests)
 Medical factors
 Physical tests (beep test)
 Technical skills
 Skill training (juggling the ball, running with the ball, dribbling, kicking, passing and ball control)
 Tactical (to help the ball carrier, to get the ball back, to offer support, to pass the ball and follow the pass, positioning and the movement into space)

External links
 PEF Saint-Sébastien-sur-Loire Home Page

Football academies in France
Football venues in France
Sports venues in Loire-Atlantique
Association football training grounds in France